The 1972 Grantland Rice Bowl was an NCAA College Division game following the 1972 season, between the Louisiana Tech Bulldogs and the Tennessee Tech Golden Eagles. Louisiana Tech quarterback Denny Duron was named outstanding offensive player, while his teammate linebacker Joe McNeely was named outstanding defensive player.

Notable participants
Louisiana Tech wide receiver Roger Carr was selected in the 1974 NFL Draft, while defensive end Fred Dean and running back Roland Harper were selected in the 1975 NFL Draft, and tight end Mike Barber  was selected in the 1976 NFL Draft. Carr, Dean, Harper, Barber, and Joe McNeely are inductees of their university's athletic hall of fame, as is head coach Maxie Lambright. Dean is an inductee of both the College Football Hall of Fame and the Pro Football Hall of Fame.

Tennessee Tech linebackers Jim Youngblood and Mike Hennigan were selected in the 1973 NFL Draft. Youngblood, Hennigan, defensive back John Fitzpatrick, and guard Howard Cochran are inductees of their university's sports hall of fame, as is head coach Don Wade. Youngblood is an inductee of the College Football Hall of Fame.

Scoring summary

Statistics

References

Further reading
 

Grantland Rice Bowl
Grantland Rice Bowl
Louisiana Tech Bulldogs football bowl games
Tennessee Tech Golden Eagles football bowl games
December 1972 sports events in the United States
Grantland Rice